Pink noise,  noise or fractal noise is a signal or process with a frequency spectrum such that the power spectral density (power per frequency interval) is inversely proportional to the frequency of the signal. In pink noise, each octave interval (halving or doubling in frequency) carries an equal amount of noise energy.

Pink noise sounds like a waterfall. It is often used to tune loudspeaker systems in professional audio. Pink noise is one of the most commonly observed signals in biological systems.

The name arises from the pink appearance of visible light with this power spectrum. This is in contrast with white noise which has equal intensity per frequency interval.

Definition

Within the scientific literature, the term 1/f noise is sometimes used loosely to refer to any noise with a power spectral density of the form

where f is frequency, and 0 < α < 2, with exponent α usually close to 1. One-dimensional signals with α = 1 are usually called pink noise.

The following function describes a length  one-dimensional pink noise signal (i.e. a Gaussian white noise signal with zero mean and sd  that has been filtered), as a sum of sine waves with different frequencies, whose amplitudes fall off inversely with the square root of frequency  (so that power, which is the square of amplitude, falls off inversely with frequency), and phases are random:

In a two-dimensional pink noise signal, the amplitude at any orientation falls off inversely with frequency. A pink noise square of length   can be written as:

General 1/f α-like noises occur widely in nature and are a source of considerable interest in many fields. Noises with α near 1 generally come from condensed-matter systems in quasi-equilibrium, as discussed below. Noises with a broad range of α generally correspond to a wide range of non-equilibrium driven dynamical systems.

Pink noise sources include flicker noise in electronic devices. In their study of fractional Brownian motion, Mandelbrot and Van Ness proposed the name fractional noise (sometimes since called fractal noise) to describe 1/f α noises for which the exponent α is not an even integer, or that are fractional derivatives of Brownian (1/f 2) noise.

Description 

In pink noise, there is equal energy per octave of frequency. The energy of pink noise at each frequency level, however, falls off at roughly 1-3 dB per octave. This is in contrast to White noise which has equal energy at all frequency levels. 

The human auditory system, which processes frequencies in a roughly logarithmic fashion approximated by the Bark scale, does not perceive different frequencies with equal sensitivity; signals around 1–4 kHz sound loudest for a given intensity. However, humans still differentiate between white noise and pink noise with ease.

Graphic equalizers also divide signals into bands logarithmically and report power by octaves; audio engineers put pink noise through a system to test whether it has a flat frequency response in the spectrum of interest. Systems that do not have a flat response can be equalized by creating an inverse filter using a graphic equalizer. Because pink noise tends to occur in natural physical systems, it is often useful in audio production. Pink noise can be processed, filtered, and/or effects can be added to produce desired sounds. Pink-noise generators are commercially available.

One parameter of noise, the peak versus average energy contents, or crest factor, is important for testing purposes, such as for audio power amplifier and loudspeaker capabilities because the signal power is a direct function of the crest factor. Various crest factors of pink noise can be used in simulations of various levels of dynamic range compression in music signals. On some digital pink-noise generators the crest factor can be specified.

Generation 

Pink noise can be computer-generated by first generating a white noise signal, Fourier-transforming it, then dividing the amplitudes of the different frequency components by the square root of the frequency (in one dimension), or by the frequency (in two dimensions) etc.  This is equivalent to spatially filtering (convolving) the white noise signal with a white-to-pink-filter. For a length  signal in one dimension, the filter has the following form:

Matlab programs are available to generate pink and other power-law coloured noise in one or  any number of dimensions.

Properties

Power-law spectra 
The power spectrum of pink noise is  only for one-dimensional signals. In every case, each octave carries an equal amount of noise power. 

The average amplitude  and power  of a pink noise signal at any orientation , and the total power across all orientations, fall off as some power of the frequency. The following table lists these power-law frequency-dependencies for pink noise signal in different dimensions, and also for general power-law colored noise with power  (e.g.: Brown noise has ):

Distribution of point values 
Consider pink noise of any dimension that is produced by generating a Gaussian white noise signal with mean  and sd , then multiplying its spectrum with a filter (equivalent to spatially filtering it with a filter ). Then the point values of the pink noise signal will also be normally distributed, with mean  and sd .

Autocorrelation 
Unlike white noise, which has no correlations across the signal, a pink noise signal is correlated with itself, as follows.

1D signal 
The Pearson's correlation coefficient of a one-dimensional pink noise signal (comprising discrete frequencies ) with itself across a distance  in the configuration (space or time) domain is:

where  is the cosine integral function.

2D signal 
The Pearson's autocorrelation coefficient of a two-dimensional pink noise signal comprising discrete frequencies is theoretically approximated as:

where  is the Bessel function of the first kind.

Occurrence 
Pink noise has been discovered in the statistical fluctuations of an extraordinarily diverse number of physical and biological systems (Press, 1978; see articles in Handel & Chung, 1993, and references therein). Examples of its occurrence include fluctuations in tide and river heights, quasar light emissions, heart beat, firings of single neurons, resistivity in solid-state electronics and single-molecule conductance signals resulting in flicker noise. Pink noise describes the statistical structure of many natural images. 

General 1/f α noises occur in many physical, biological and economic systems, and some researchers describe them as being ubiquitous. In physical systems, they are present in some meteorological data series, the electromagnetic radiation output of some astronomical bodies. In biological systems, they are present in, for example, heart beat rhythms, neural activity, and the statistics of DNA sequences, as a generalized pattern.

An accessible introduction to the significance of pink noise is one given by Martin Gardner (1978) in his Scientific American column "Mathematical Games". In this column, Gardner asked for the sense in which music imitates nature. Sounds in nature are not musical in that they tend to be either too repetitive (bird song, insect noises) or too chaotic (ocean surf, wind in trees, and so forth). The answer to this question was given in a statistical sense by Voss and Clarke (1975, 1978), who showed that pitch and loudness fluctuations in speech and music are pink noises. So music is like tides not in terms of how tides sound, but in how tide heights vary.

In brains, pink noise has been widely observed across many temporal and physical scales from ion channel gating to EEG and MEG recordings in humans. In clinical EEG, deviations from this 1/f pink noise can be used to identify epilepsy, even in the absence of a seizure, or during the interictal state. Classic models of EEG generators suggested that dendritic inputs in gray matter were principally responsible for generating the 1/f power spectrum observed in EEG/MEG signals.  However, recent computational models using cable theory have  shown that action potential transduction along white matter tracts in the brain also generates a 1/f spectral density.  Therefore, white matter signal transduction may also contribute to pink noise measured in scalp EEG recordings.

It has also been successfully applied to the modeling of mental states in psychology, and used to explain stylistic variations in music from different cultures and historic periods. Richard F. Voss and J. Clarke claim that almost all musical melodies, when each successive note is plotted on a scale of pitches, will tend towards a pink noise spectrum. Similarly, a generally pink distribution pattern has been observed in film shot length by researcher James E. Cutting of Cornell University, in the study of 150 popular movies released from 1935 to 2005.

Pink noise has also been found to be endemic in human response. Gilden et al. (1995) found extremely pure examples of this noise in the time series formed upon iterated production of temporal and spatial intervals. Later, Gilden (1997) and Gilden (2001) found that time series formed from reaction time measurement and from iterated two-alternative forced choice also produced pink noises.

Electronic devices

The principal sources of pink noise in electronic devices are almost invariably the slow fluctuations of properties of the condensed-matter materials of the devices. In many cases the specific sources of the fluctuations are known. These include fluctuating configurations of defects in metals, fluctuating occupancies of traps in semiconductors, and fluctuating domain structures in magnetic materials. The explanation for the approximately pink spectral form turns out to be relatively trivial, usually coming from a distribution of kinetic activation energies of the fluctuating processes. Since the frequency range of the typical noise experiment (e.g., 1 Hz – 1 kHz) is low compared with typical microscopic "attempt frequencies" (e.g., 1014 Hz), the exponential factors in the Arrhenius equation for the rates are large. Relatively small spreads in the activation energies appearing in these exponents then result in large spreads of characteristic rates. In the simplest toy case, a flat distribution of activation energies gives exactly a pink spectrum, because 

There is no known lower bound to background pink noise in electronics. Measurements made down to 10−6 Hz (taking several weeks) have not shown a ceasing of pink-noise behaviour.

A pioneering researcher in this field was Aldert van der Ziel.

In gravitational wave astronomy

1/f α noises with α near 1 are a factor in gravitational-wave astronomy. The noise curve at very low frequencies affects pulsar timing arrays, the European Pulsar Timing Array (EPTA) and the future International Pulsar Timing Array (IPTA); at low frequencies are space-borne detectors, the formerly proposed Laser Interferometer Space Antenna (LISA) and the currently proposed evolved Laser Interferometer Space Antenna (eLISA), and at high frequencies are ground-based detectors, the initial Laser Interferometer Gravitational-Wave Observatory (LIGO) and its advanced configuration (aLIGO). The characteristic strain of potential astrophysical sources are also shown. To be detectable the characteristic strain of a signal must be above the noise curve.

Climate change
Pink noise on timescales of decades has been found in climate proxy data, which may indicate amplification and coupling of processes in the climate system.

Diffusion processes 
Many time-dependent stochastic processes are known to exhibit 1/f α noises with α between 0 and 2. In particular Brownian motion has a power spectral density that equals 4D/f 2, where D is the diffusion coefficient. This type of spectrum is sometimes referred to as Brownian noise. Interestingly, the analysis of individual Brownian motion trajectories also show 1/f 2 spectrum, albeit with random amplitudes. Fractional Brownian motion with Hurst exponent H also show 1/f α power spectral density with α=2H+1 for subdiffusive processes (H<0.5) and α=2 for superdiffusive processes (0.5<H<1).

Origin 

There are many theories about the origin of pink noise. Some theories attempt to be universal, while others apply to only a certain type of material, such as semiconductors. Universal theories of pink noise remain a matter of current research interest.

A hypothesis (referred to as the Tweedie hypothesis) has been proposed to explain the genesis of pink noise on the basis of a mathematical convergence theorem related to the central limit theorem of statistics. The Tweedie convergence theorem describes the convergence of certain statistical processes towards a family of statistical models known as the Tweedie distributions. These distributions are characterized by a variance to mean power law, that have been variously identified in the ecological literature as Taylor's law and in the physics literature as fluctuation scaling. When this variance to mean power law is demonstrated by the method of expanding enumerative bins this implies the presence of pink noise, and vice versa. Both of these effects can be shown to be the consequence of mathematical convergence such as how certain kinds of data will converge towards the normal distribution under the central limit theorem. This hypothesis also provides for an alternative paradigm to explain power law manifestations that have been attributed to self-organized criticality.

There are various mathematical models to create pink noise. Although self-organised criticality has been able to reproduce pink noise in sandpile models, these do not have a Gaussian distribution or other expected statistical qualities. It can be generated on computer, for example, by filtering white noise, inverse Fourier transform, or by multirate variants on standard white noise generation.

In supersymmetric theory of stochastics, an approximation-free theory of stochastic differential equations, 1/f noise is one of the manifestations of the spontaneous breakdown of topological supersymmetry. This supersymmetry is an intrinsic property of all stochastic differential equations and its meaning is the preservation of the continuity of the phase space by continuous time dynamics. Spontaneous breakdown of this supersymmetry is the stochastic generalization of the concept of deterministic chaos, whereas the associated emergence of the long-term dynamical memory or order, i.e., 1/f and crackling noises, the Butterfly effect etc., is the consequence of the Goldstone theorem in the application to the spontaneously broken topological supersymmetry.

Audio testing
Pink noise is commonly used to test the loudspeakers in sound reinforcement systems, with the resulting sound measured with a test microphone in the listening space connected to a spectrum analyzer or a computer running a real-time fast Fourier transform (FFT) analyzer program such as Smaart. The sound system plays pink noise while the audio engineer makes adjustments on an audio equalizer to obtain the desired results. Pink noise is predictable and repeatable, but it is annoying for a concert audience to hear. Since the late 1990s, FFT-based analysis enabled the engineer to make adjustments using pre-recorded music as the test signal, or even the music coming from the performers in real time. Pink noise is still used by audio system contractors and by computerized sound systems which incorporate an automatic equalization feature.

In manufacturing, pink noise is often used as a burn-in signal for audio amplifiers and other components, to determine whether the component will maintain performance integrity during sustained use. The process of end-users burning in their headphones with pink noise to attain higher fidelity has been called an audiophile "myth".

See also 

 Architectural acoustics
 Audio signal processing
 Brownian noise
 White noise
 Colors of noise
 Crest factor
 Fractal
 Flicker noise
 Johnson–Nyquist noise
 Noise (physics)
 Quantum 1/f noise
 Self-organised criticality
 Shot noise
 Sound masking
 Statistics

Footnotes

References

External links 
 Coloured Noise: Matlab toolbox to generate power-law coloured noise signals of any dimensions.
 Powernoise: Matlab software for generating 1/f noise, or more generally, 1/fα noise
 1/f noise at Scholarpedia
 White Noise Definition Vs Pink Noise

Noise (electronics)
Sound
Acoustics